Hanagodu is a small village near Hunsur city in Mysore district of Karnataka state, India.

Post Office
There is a separate post office in the village and the postal code of the village is 571105.

Location
Hanagodu village is located about 20 km south of Hunsur city. The population of the village is 3,023. The male population is 1,524 while female population is 1,499. Literacy rate of hanagodu village is 60.21% out of which 67.45% males and 52.84% females are literate. There are about 721 houses in hanagodu village.

Administration
Hanagodu village is administrated by a sarpanch who is an elected representative. As per the 2019 stats, Hanagodu village comes under Hunsur assembly constituency and Mysuru parliamentary constituency. Piriyapatna is the nearest town to Hanagodu village for all major economic activities, which is approximately 17 km away.

Facilities
The village has a branch of Canara Bank, a post office, a lodge and a few tea shops.

Economy
Ginger cultivation is the main economic activity of the village. Coconuts, bananas and arecanuts are also cultivated.

References

Villages in Mysore district